The canton of La Montagne d'Alaric is an administrative division of the Aude department, southern France. It was created at the French canton reorganisation which came into effect in March 2015. Its seat is in Trèbes.

It consists of the following communes:
 
Arquettes-en-Val
Badens
Barbaira
Berriac
Blomac
Bouilhonnac
Capendu
Caunettes-en-Val
Comigne
Douzens
Fajac-en-Val
Floure
Fontiès-d'Aude
Labastide-en-Val
Marseillette
Mayronnes
Montirat
Monze
Moux
Rieux-en-Val
Roquecourbe-Minervois
Saint-Couat-d'Aude
Serviès-en-Val
Taurize
Trèbes
Val-de-Dagne
Villar-en-Val
Villedubert
Villetritouls

References

Cantons of Aude